Nannoperca or pygmy perch is a genus of temperate perches endemic to freshwater systems of Australia.

Species
The currently recognized species in this genus are:
 Nannoperca australis Günther, 1861 (Southern pygmy perch)
 Nannoperca obscura (Klunzinger, 1872) (Yarra pygmy perch)
 Nannoperca oxleyana Whitley, 1940 (Oxleyan pygmy perch)
 Nannoperca pygmaea D. L. Morgan, Beatty & M. Adams, 2013 (little pygmy perch)
 Nannoperca variegata Kuiter & G. R. Allen, 1986 (golden pygmy perch)
 Nannoperca vittata (Castelnau, 1873) (western pygmy perch)
 Balston's pygmy perch, previously Nannoperca balstoni, has now been renamed Nannatherina balstoni.

References

 

Taxa named by Albert Günther
Freshwater fish genera
Taxonomy articles created by Polbot
Perciformes genera